Voss is an unincorporated community in Walsh County, North Dakota, United States.

References

Unincorporated communities in Walsh County, North Dakota
Unincorporated communities in North Dakota